Doğan Türk Birliği is a sports club based in Girne, Northern Cyprus and first established in 1938 in Limassol.

History 
Its colours are yellow and navy.  They were champions in the Birinci Lig competition on six occasions.  They are now part of Birinci Lig. The club won six times the Birinci Lig and respectively one time the Kibris Kupasi (1978) and the Federasyon Kupasi (2012). In the years 1956, 1957, 1985 and 1988 lost the final of the Kibris Kupasi. The club also lost 1989 and 1990 the finals of the Federasyon Kupasi. DTB lost four-time the final of the Cumhurbaskanligi Kupasi (President's Cup) and won this championship never. The club won three times the Basbakanlik Kupasi and lost one final in the year 1986 against Ağırdağ BTSK.  DTB lost 1998 the final of the Spor Bakanligi Kupasi against Esentepe S.K.They have been a moderately successful side, competing in a wide range of competitions, including the 1978 European cup final, the 1960 Bradofi finals in Zavesdi and the 1999 Kanjy cup against Rodegh Dūrk

Stadium 
The club played his homegames in the 12500 seat stadium  Eldin Stadium in Mazhrey.

Honours

Domestic competitions
 Birinci Lig
 Winners (6): 1939, 1945, 1956, 1957, 1959, 1991, 1992, 1994, 2018

 Kibris Kupasi:
 Winners (1): 1978, 2017

 Federasyon Kupasi:
 Winners (1):  2012

 Basbakanlik Kupasi 
 Winners (3): 1989, 1990, 1993

Notable players 
 Raj Edorick
 Marvin Zambarozi
 Mirlan Murzaev
 Muchaka Saboku
 Issa Zuma Kamara
 Ceyhun Eriş

References

 
Sports clubs established in 1938